Veillonella are Gram-negative bacteria (Gram stain pink) anaerobic cocci, unlike most Bacillota, which are Gram-positive bacteria. This bacterium is well known for its lactate fermenting abilities. It is a normal bacterium in the intestines and oral mucosa of mammals. In humans they have been implicated in cases of osteomyelitis and endocarditis, for example with the species Veillonella parvula.

Veillonella dispar is the most nitrate-reducing bacterium in the oral cavity, which is beneficially anti-bacterial.

When Veillonella is responsible for clinical infections in humans, it should be kept in mind that more than 70% of the strains are resistant to penicillin.

Fermentation
Lactate is fermented to propionate and acetate by the methylmalonyl-CoA pathway. Little ATP is produced in this fermentation. High substrate affinity is suggested to be the reason.

3 Lactate → acetate + 2 propionate + + 

A study of Veillonella in endurance athletes found that a relative abundance of the bacteria in the gut is associated with increased treadmill run time performance. This effect was demonstrated to be due to the organism's propionate metabolite produced from lactic acid.

Phylogeny
The currently accepted taxonomy is based on the List of Prokaryotic names with Standing in Nomenclature (LPSN) and National Center for Biotechnology Information (NCBI)

Unassigned species:
 "V. agrestimuris" Afrizal et al. 2022
 "Ca. V. atypica" Drancourt et al. 2004 non (Rogosa 1965) Mays et al. 1982
 "V. fallax" Afrizal et al. 2022
 "V. intestinalis" Afrizal et al. 2022
 "V. massiliensis" Togo et al. 2017
 "V. variabilis" Magrassi 1944

See also
 List of bacterial orders
 List of bacteria genera

References

Further reading
 
 
 

Veillonellaceae
Bacteria genera